César Ernesto de Cesare (born 12 July 1980) is an Argentine-born Ecuadorian sprint canoeist. He won the K-1 200 m event at the 2011 Pan American Games and finished third in 2015; he also had a fourth-place finish at the 2013 World Championships. He placed 11th–12th at the 2012 and 2016 Olympics and served as the Olympic flag bearer for Ecuador in 2012.

Cesare is married to Mayra and has two daughters, Luana and Maia. He took up kayaking in Argentina around 1990, and semi-retired for ten years in 1999 due to a shoulder injury. During that time he worked as a taxi and truck driver to support his family. In 2009, he immigrated to Ecuador to help his younger brother Sebastian, who coached the Ecuadorian canoe team. In Ecuador he resumed competing, and received Ecuadorian citizenship the day before leaving for the 2011 World Championships. In December 2011 he was named Athlete of the Month by the International Canoe Federation.

References

External links
 
 

1980 births
Canoeists at the 2012 Summer Olympics
Canoeists at the 2016 Summer Olympics
Ecuadorian male canoeists
Argentine male canoeists
Living people
Argentine emigrants to Ecuador
Naturalized citizens of Ecuador
Olympic canoeists of Ecuador
Pan American Games medalists in canoeing
Pan American Games gold medalists for Ecuador
Pan American Games bronze medalists for Ecuador
Canoeists at the 2011 Pan American Games
Canoeists at the 2015 Pan American Games
Medalists at the 2011 Pan American Games
Medalists at the 2015 Pan American Games
Medalists at the 2019 Pan American Games